Leptotes can refer to:
 Leptotes (butterfly), a genus of butterflies
 Leptotes (plant), a genus of orchids